Amino is an adjective form of ammonia.

Amino may also refer to:

Amino (app), an American online application
Amino (surname), a Japanese surname
Amino Station, a railway station in Kyōtango, Kyoto Prefecture, Japan

See also
Amino acid, a molecule that contains both amine and carboxyl functional groups
Amino alcohol, a molecule that contains both an amine and an alcohol functional group
Amino sugar, a sugar that contains an amine group in place of a hydroxyl group
Amine (disambiguation)